Abdallah Bey (died 1799, Jaffa) was an Ottoman Arab statesman who served as the governor of Jaffa in the Sidon Eyalet under Wāli Ahmad Pasha al-Jazzar in the late 18th century.

During the French campaign in Egypt and Syria, Napoleon Bonaparte ordered his troops to seize Jaffa to cement the recent French foothold within the Levant following the Siege of El Arish. After the city fell to the French troops, Napoleon had Abdallah Bey executed along with several thousand Muslim prisoners of war, reportedly in retaliation for the brutal killing of Napoleon's messengers to the city, who were tortured, castrated and decapitated, with their heads impaled on the city walls ahead of the battle by the Ottomans.

References

18th-century births
1799 deaths
18th-century people from the Ottoman Empire
Governors of the Ottoman Empire
Muslims from the Ottoman Empire
Ottoman military leaders of the French Revolutionary Wars
18th-century executions by France
Executed people from the Ottoman Empire